Wade du Plessis (born 12 May 1967) in South Africa is a retired South African association football player, who played in South Africa for Kaizer Chiefs and AmaZulu.

International career
He made his international debut on 30 November 1994 in a 0–0 draw against Ivory Coast and played his second and last international in a 1–1 draw against Cameroon on 3 December 1994.

References

1967 births
Living people
Association football goalkeepers
Kaizer Chiefs F.C. players
South African people of French descent
South African soccer players
South Africa international soccer players
Michau Warriors F.C. players